Matilde de Godoy di Bassano, dei principi Godoy di Bassano 4th Countess of Castillo Fiel, (in full), (22 June 1830 - 1901) was a Spanish and Italian aristocrat.

She was born in Paris, the daughter of Manuel de Godoy di Bassano, 2nd Prince Godoy di Bassano and of María Carolina Crowe y O'Donovan O'Neill.

Marriage and children
In 1853, she married 1st with Don Felix Martín y Romero, Superior Chief of Civil Administration (a high-level civil servant), Commander of the Order of Charles III, Secretary of HCM [Her Catholic Majesty] with exercise of Decrees, and had two daughters: 

María Martín-Romero, 5th Countess of Castillo Fiel
Francisca Martin-Romero (19 September 1856, Madrid) 

On 2 April 1875, she married 2nd Don Bernardo Bruzón y Rodriguez (a Genoese-Cuban landholder and industrialist), with issue. She died in Madrid.

Sources

1830 births
1901 deaths
Spanish countesses
Italian nobility
Matilde 04
Matilde 04
Year of death unknown